SERM may refer to:

 Selective estrogen receptor modulator
 Structured-Entity-Relationship-Model
 Search engine reputation management